Gary Georges (born 17 February 1953) is a Haitian sprinter. He competed in the men's 200 metres at the 1972 Summer Olympics.

References

External links
 

1953 births
Living people
Athletes (track and field) at the 1972 Summer Olympics
Haitian male sprinters
Olympic athletes of Haiti
Place of birth missing (living people)